Agustín Canobbio Graviz (born 1 October 1998) is a Uruguayan professional footballer who plays as a winger for Brazilian club Athletico Paranaense and the Uruguay national team.

Club career
Canobbio is a youth academy graduate of Fénix. He made his professional debut for the club on 30 August 2016 in a 1–0 league defeat against Cerro. He joined Peñarol in January 2018.

International career
Canobbio is a former Uruguayan youth national team player. He was part of under-20 team which won 2017 South American U-20 Championship and reached semi-finals of 2017 FIFA U-20 World Cup.

On 7 January 2022, Canobbio was named in Uruguay's 50-man preliminary squad for FIFA World Cup qualifying matches against Paraguay and Venezuela. He made his senior team debut on 27 January 2022 in a 1–0 win against Paraguay.

Personal life
Canobbio is son of former Uruguayan international Osvaldo Canobbio.

Career statistics

International

Honours
Peñarol
 Uruguayan Primera División: 2018, 2021
 Supercopa Uruguaya: 2018

Uruguay U20
 South American Youth Football Championship: 2017

Individual
 Uruguayan Primera División Player of the Year: 2021
 Uruguayan Primera División Team of the Year: 2021

References

External links
 

1998 births
Living people
Footballers from Montevideo
Uruguayan sportspeople of Italian descent
Association football forwards
Uruguayan footballers
Uruguay youth international footballers
Uruguay under-20 international footballers
Uruguay international footballers
Uruguayan Primera División players
Campeonato Brasileiro Série A players
Centro Atlético Fénix players
Peñarol players
Club Athletico Paranaense players
2022 FIFA World Cup players
Uruguayan expatriate footballers
Uruguayan expatriate sportspeople in Brazil
Expatriate footballers in Brazil